Kaunas County is one of ten counties of Lithuania. It is in the centre of the country, and its capital is Kaunas. On 1 July 2010, the county administration was abolished.

Symbols
The county's coat of arms can be blazoned as follows: Gules, an aurochs head caboshed argent ensigned by a cross Or between his horns enclosed by a bordure purpure charged with ten evenly distributed crosses of Lorraine Or.

The flag's heraldic blazon is identical, since the flag is a banner of the arms.

Municipalities
The county is subdivided into municipalities:

References

External links
Social and demographic characteristics of Kaunas County
Economy of Kaunas County
Environment of Kaunas County

 
Counties of Lithuania